Loveworld Records is an independent record label established by Chris Oyakhilome with the sole aim of discovering and developing gospel artists. Founded in 2009, the record label has gone on to groom and produce notable gospel musicians including Sinach, Frank Edwards, Joe Praize; among others.

Artists roster
Ada Ehi
Buchi
Chris Shalom
Eben
Frank Edwards
Jahdiel
Joe Praize
Sinach
Martin PK
Sophiya
cso
Tru South1
TB-1
Sam Jamz
Protek
Soltune
Winter
G Clan
Cyude
Mr Noble
Temple
Clinton Patrick
Lizzy abioye
yomam

References

Record labels established in 2009
Nigerian record labels
Nigerian companies established in 2009